Hamood Ullah Khan is a citizen of Pakistan who was held in extrajudicial detention in the United States's Guantanamo Bay detention camps, in Cuba.
His Guantanamo Internment Serial Number was 145.

He was repatriated on September 17, 2004.

McClatchy News Service interview

On June 15, 2008, the McClatchy News Service published a series of articles based on interviews with 66 former Guantanamo captives.
Hamood Ullah Khan
was one of three former captives who had an article profiling him.

Hamood Ullah Khan described being beaten so severely as soon as he arrived at the Kandahar detention facility that he passed out.
McClatchy team reported that they got access to a confidential report on the effect on US detention on Hamood Ullah Khan and 34 other former captives:

Hamood Ullah Khan said he was a pharmaceutical representative, who had been in Afghanistan on business when he was captured.  
He said he had decided to be a model prisoner, and thus avoided the beatings he saw guards administer to other captives, and was transferred to camp 4, the camp for the most compliant captives.

Hamood Ullah described watching an Arab captive named Juma, who had chosen to be argumentative, and confront the guards—who: "Eventually he was totally mad.".

Hamood Ullah said he spent a further nine and a half months in Pakistani custody after he was repatriated.

At the time of his interview he was teaching at a madrassa.

References

External links
 The Guantánamo Files: Website Extras (7) – From Sheberghan to Kandahar Andy Worthington
McClatchy News Service - Hamoodullah Khan
McClatchy News Service - video

Living people
Guantanamo detainees known to have been released
Year of birth missing (living people)